Phoebe Bacon (born August 12, 2002) is an American swimmer. In 2021, she qualified for the US Olympic Swimming Team, placing second in the 200m backstroke at the Olympic Team Trials. She holds the 5th fastest 100 m (long course) Backstroke swim in the world for the 2019 calendar year,
and was a member of the gold-medal winning 4x100m medley relay team at the 2019 Pan American Games. She also won three gold medals at the 2018 Junior Pan Pacific Championships, and was a gold medalist in the 100m back at 2019 Pan American Games. Additionally, she was a gold medalist in the 100m back at the 2019 Toyota U.S. Open, beating the world record holding Regan Smith.

Career 
Bacon began swimming during the summer at the age of 3 for the Tallyho Foxes, and later joined Nation's Capital Swim Club, the same club as Katie Ledecky, at the American University site. Under the Silver coach Ian Rowe, Bacon qualified for the 2016 US Olympic Trials, at the age of 14. During the 2017 season, Phoebe moved up to the Gold I group, where she is currently coached by Timothy Kelly jr. On April 21, 2019 she verbally committed to swim for the University of Wisconsin.

Personal life 
Phoebe was raised in Bethesda, MD and is the daughter of Timothy J. Bacon and Philippa Bacon. Phoebe has 3 siblings.

References

External links
 

2002 births
Living people
American female backstroke swimmers
Pan American Games medalists in swimming
Pan American Games gold medalists for the United States
Swimmers at the 2019 Pan American Games
Medalists at the 2019 Pan American Games
Swimmers at the 2020 Summer Olympics
Olympic swimmers of the United States
Wisconsin Badgers women's swimmers
World Aquatics Championships medalists in swimming
21st-century American women